John Francis McFall, Baron McFall of Alcluith,  (born 4 October 1944) is a British politician, now the Lord Speaker having previously been Senior Deputy Speaker of the House of Lords from 1 September 2016 to 30 April 2021. He was previously a Labour and Co-operative Member of Parliament from 1987 to 2010, first for Dumbarton and then from 2005 for West Dunbartonshire. He also served as Chairman of the House of Commons Treasury Committee.

In 2021, McFall was elected as Lord Speaker to replace Lord Fowler.

Early life
McFall went to a boys' school, St Patrick's Secondary School (since merged with Notre Dame High School to form Our Lady & St Patrick's High School), on Hawthornhill Road in Castlehill, Dumbarton, leaving without any qualifications at 15. His father was a school caretaker and his mother had a newsagents shop, which sparked his (later) interest in how to run businesses. He worked for the local Parks Department in Dumbarton and then in a factory.

At the age of 24, he studied at Paisley College of Technology (now the University of the West of Scotland) receiving a BSc in Chemistry. In 1977, he wanted to widen his knowledge away from science and obtained a BA from the Open University in Education and Philosophy. He was a chemistry and maths teacher from 1974–1987 in Dumbarton, Kirkintilloch and Glasgow, becoming a deputy-head in Glasgow and Secretary of his Constituency Labour Party before he entered Parliament. Whilst a teacher he completed a part-time course over three years at the University of Strathclyde for an MBA. In 1994, he became a Visiting Professor at Strathclyde University Business School, and now is a member of the Strategic Advisory Board at the University of Glasgow Business School. He is a member of the GMB Union.

Political career
He was first elected for the Dumbarton constituency, Scotland, at the 1987 general election, after the previous MP, Ian Campbell retired. His original majority was a little over 2,000. Dumbarton constituency was replaced with the new West Dunbartonshire constituency for the 2005 general election, which McFall won with a majority over 12,500.

In 1995 he introduced a private member's bill, the Wild Mammals (Protection) Bill which, although unsuccessful, informed the Hunting Act 2004 outlawing the hunting of mammals by dogs in England and Wales.

He was a whip and junior minister (for Education, Training and Employment, Health and Community Relations, then in 1999 for Economy and Education) at the Northern Ireland Office from 1998–99.

In 2001 he was appointed Chair of the Treasury Select Committee, and reappointed for a second term in this position in 2005. The committee conducted inquiries into the banking crisis, producing evidence of the bonus culture, the lack of banking qualifications among many top bankers and poor oversight of the industry by the Financial Services Authority.

On 29 January 2010, McFall announced his intention to stand down as an MP at the 2010 general election.

On 17 June 2010, he was created a life peer as Baron McFall of Alcluith, of Dumbarton in the County of Dunbartonshire, and was introduced in the House of Lords on 6 July 2010.

He is currently the Vice-Chair of the All-Party Parliamentary Group on Overseas Development (Apgood).

In July 2016, he was appointed as Chairman of Committees of the House of Lords with effect from 1 September 2016. He was known as Senior Deputy Speaker while holding the office.

In April 2021, he was elected as Lord Speaker succeeding Lord Fowler.

Other activities
He is Chair of the Scotch Whisky and Spirits All-Party Parliamentary Group (APPG) and of the Royal Navy APPG.

He was Chairman of Strathleven Regeneration Company and of Clydebank re-built, two development companies based in his constituency.

He gave his backing to Dumpster Kids, a not-for-profit organisation aimed at rescuing abandoned children, in January 2011.

Personal life
He is married to Joan, a former teacher from Dumbarton, with four children.

Publications
Workplace Retirement Income Commission, Building a Strong, Stable and Transparent Pension System: Final Report (August 2011)

See also
 2008 United Kingdom bank rescue package

References

External links 
 Official Website 
 Guardian Unlimited Politics – Ask Aristotle: John McFall MP
 TheyWorkForYou.com – John McFall MP
 
 BBC Politics Profile
 Treasury Select Committee

News items
 4 May 2008 – Treasury hard man is really a softy at heart
 19 April 2008 – John McFall urges clarity on tax rates
 15 April 2008 – John McFall speaks about abolition of 10p tax rate
 7 April 2008 – Government must gauge effect of winter heating payments on fuel poverty
 26 March 2008 – John McFall speaks about Northern Rock regulator's failure on BBC Breakfast
 10 March 2008 – Added value
 5 March 2008 – Helping people back into work
 3 March 2008 – McFall cut up credit card over insurance letters
 3 March 2008 – Banks "refused to believe the good times were about to end"
 Telegraph interview December 2007
 Criticising banks in 2006 for being unsympathetic
 Advising that bank ATMs should explicitly mention charges in 2005
 Little praise for the savings industry in 2004
 Talking about endowment mortgage shortfalls in 2004
 High credit card charges in 2003
 Confusing bank charges in 2002
 New Economy minister in Northern Ireland in 1999
 Wanting lifelong learning in Northern Ireland in 1998

Video clips
 

|-

|-

|-

|-

1944 births
Living people
Scottish people of Irish descent
Alumni of the Open University
Alumni of the University of Strathclyde
Alumni of the University of the West of Scotland
Labour Co-operative MPs for Scottish constituencies
Members of the Privy Council of the United Kingdom
People from Dumbarton
Scottish Roman Catholics
Scottish schoolteachers
UK MPs 1987–1992
UK MPs 1992–1997
UK MPs 1997–2001
UK MPs 2001–2005
UK MPs 2005–2010
Labour Co-operative life peers
Life peers created by Elizabeth II
Lords Speaker